Mondolfi's four-eyed opossum (Philander mondolfii) is a South American species of opossum found in Colombia and Venezuela, first described in 2006. It inhabits foothills of the Cordillera de Mérida and those on the eastern side of the Cordillera Oriental at elevations from 50 to 800 m. Populations in the two ranges may represent distinct subspecies. It is named after Venezuelan biologist Edgardo Mondolfi. It has short woolly fur with a pale cream-colored venter as well as large ears pigmented on only the distal half.

References

Sources 

Opossums
Mammals of Colombia
Mammals of Venezuela
Mammals described in 2006